Marry Me! (alternative title: I Want to Get Married) is a 1949 British comedy film directed by Terence Fisher, and starring Derek Bond, Susan Shaw, Patrick Holt, Carol Marsh and David Tomlinson.

The film was formerly known as I Want to Get Married.

Plot
Newspaper journalist David Haig is assigned by his Fleet Street editor to go undercover and write about the people behind the ads in the Marriage Chronicle, a weekly newspaper published by the H & E Marriage Bureau. During his initial interview with owners Hester and Emily Parsons, he tells them he is an Australian sheepman and steals some of their files.

Dancehall hostess Pat Cooper is fed up with her life. She is paired with self-described "country bumpkin" Martin Roberts. He makes a good first impression; then she learns he is a clergyman and backs out. However, he persists and wins her over. He is on the point of asking for her hand in marriage when Brenda Delamere, her flatmate, inadvertently reveals her true occupation. After digesting the news, he decides he still wants her, but she pretends she was only toying with him and sends him away.

Frenchwoman Marcelle Duclos' permit is expiring, so she seeks a husband to remain in Britain, offering £500 as further inducement. Andrew Scott needs some capital to purchase a partnership. They are honest with each other about their reasons for marriage. After they fall in love, she informs him that she was the girlfriend of a charming, handsome man who turned out to be a thief and murderer named Louis Renier. When she learned he had escaped from prison, she fled to England. She is horrified to spot him. She confesses to Scott that she is actually Renier's wife. He refuses to leave her, despite the danger. Renier finds her and waits for Scott with a pistol. The two men struggle, and Renier falls over the balcony to his death.

Saunders, Sir Gordon Scott's valet, is retiring and buying a farm. The cynical Scott disapproves of marriage and women in general. Scott impersonates Saunders on the spur of the moment when Saunders' match, schoolteacher Enid Lawson, telephones. Upon meeting the woman, Scott deliberately behaves obnoxiously, but is impressed by her spirited rejection. When she starts to leave, he tries to explain his behaviour, but she slaps him. She returns, having forgotten her gloves, and all becomes clear to her when the real Saunders appears. She stays for dinner, served by Saunders. Afterwards, she is astonished to learn that not only has Saunders quickly deduced her identity, he also believes that she is not good enough for him. She departs posthaste. Scott cannot get her out of her mind and goes to the marriage bureau to try to obtain her address. Lawson has just left, but returns for her gloves, and all is eventually forgiven.

Miss Beamish is selected for Haig. He is unimpressed and leaves after a brief conversation. On the street, he bumps into Doris Pearson, the second choice of the bureau. They get along, but are each lying to the other. She claims she is from the upper class, whereas she is  constantly making up fantasies about herself. When Haig's article is published, complete with a photograph, she sees it and breaks up with him, stating that she hates liars. He cannot find her, until he goes to the restaurant where she works as a waitress. He manages to persuade her to agree to marry him.

Cast
 Derek Bond as Andrew
 Susan Shaw as Pat
 Patrick Holt as Martin
 Carol Marsh as Doris
 David Tomlinson as David
 Zena Marshall as Marcelle
 Guy Middleton as Sir Gordon
 Nora Swinburne as Enid
 Brenda Bruce as Brenda
 Jean Cadell as Hester Parsons
 Mary Jerrold as Emily Parsons
 Denis O'Dea as Saunders
 Yvonne Owen as Sue Carson
 Alison Leggatt as Miss Beamish
 Beatrice Varley as Mrs. Perrins
 Cyril Chamberlain as PC Jackson
 Hal Osmond as Man in Restaurant
 Russell Waters as Mr. Pearson
 Joan Hickson as Mrs. Pearson
 Marianne Stone as Elsie
 J. H. Roberts as Old Gent in Train
 Lyn Evans as Railway Official
 Anthony Steel as Jack Harris (in one of his first appearances on screen)
 Albert Lieven as Louis Renier (uncredited)
 George Merritt as Gazette Editor (uncredited)
 Eric Pohlmann as Mr. Cinelli (uncredited)
 John Salew as Charlie (uncredited)
 Anne Valery as Girl in David's Office (uncredited)

Reception
The film was a box office flop, recording a loss of £67,600. Bosley Crowther in The New York Times found the first third of the film "a delight to watch," but, despite convincing dialogue and an "excellent cast", "the film as a whole is a disappointingly contrived package job". Crowther thought that the best story, with Guy Middleton, "rates inclusion in one of the Somerset Maugham showcases", but he concluded that the writers "have blunted their ingenious stories with some melodramatic and whimsical resolutions. Terrence Fisher's direction is strictly assembly-line."

References

External links
 
 

1949 films
1949 romantic comedy films
1940s British films
British black-and-white films
British romantic comedy films
Films about journalists
Films directed by Terence Fisher
Films scored by Clifton Parker
Films set in London
Gainsborough Pictures films
1940s English-language films